The discography of Sowelu consists of five studio albums, one extended play, two compilation albums, 18 singles and multiple appearances on cover compilation albums, as well as a featured artist on other musicians' works. Sowelu's solo discography is spread across two record labels, DefStar Records between 2002 and 2009, and Rhythm Zone from 2010 onwards.

Albums

Original albums

Extended plays

Other albums

Singles

Promotional singles

As featured artist

Other appearances

DVDs

References

Discographies of Japanese artists
Pop music discographies